Saguache County (suh-WATCH ) is a county located in the U.S. state of Colorado. As of the 2020 census, the population was 6,368. The county seat is Saguache.

History
Saguache County was formed December 29, 1866 in the Territory of Colorado when it was extracted from the northern half of Costilla County. A partition from Lake County on February 9, 1872, added the northwest section of the present-day county.

Geography
It is the 7th largest of Colorado's 64 counties.

Adjacent counties

Chaffee County - north
Fremont County - northeast
Custer County - east
Huerfano County - southeast
Rio Grande County - south
Alamosa County - south
Mineral County - southwest
Hinsdale County - southwest
Gunnison County - northwest

Major Highways
  U.S. Highway 285
  State Highway 17
  State Highway 112
  State Highway 114

National protected areas
Great Sand Dunes National Park and Preserve
Great Sand Dunes Wilderness
Gunnison National Forest
La Garita Wilderness
Rio Grande National Forest
Sangre de Cristo Wilderness

Trails and byways
Colorado Trail
Continental Divide National Scenic Trail
Great Parks Bicycle Route
Liberty Road historic mail route open to foot, horse, and bicycle travel between Crestone and the ghost towns of Duncan and Liberty crossing the Baca Mountain Tract Rio Grande National Forest.
Medano Pass Primitive Road
Montville Nature Trail
Mosca Pass Trail
Old Spanish National Historic Trail
Sand Ramp Trail, a hiking trail within the Great Sand Dunes National Park and Preserve which skirts the east and north of the dune field.
Western Express Bicycle Route

Demographics

As of the census of 2000, there were 5,917 people, 2,300 households, and 1,557 families living in the county. The population density was 2 people per square mile (1/km2). There were 3,087 housing units at an average density of 1 per square mile (0/km2). The racial makeup of the county was 71.29% White, 0.12% Black or African American, 2.06% Native American, 0.46% Asian, 23.00% from other races, and 3.08% from two or more races. 45.26% of the population were Hispanic or Latino of any race.

There were 2,300 households, out of which 33.40% had children under the age of 18 living with them, 52.70% were married couples living together, 11.00% had a female householder with no husband present, and 32.30% were non-families. 26.90% of all households were made up of individuals, and 7.70% had someone living alone who was 65 years of age or older. The average household size was 2.56 and the average family size was 3.15.

In the county, the population was spread out, with 28.40% under the age of 18, 7.90% from 18 to 24, 26.00% from 25 to 44, 26.90% from 45 to 64, and 10.80% who were 65 years of age or older. The median age was 37 years. For every 100 females there were 101.70 males. For every 100 females age 18 and over, there were 99.70 males.

The median income for a household in the county was $25,495, and the median income for a family was $29,405. Males had a median income of $25,158 versus $18,862 for females. The per capita income for the county was $13,121. About 18.70% of families and 22.60% of the population were below the poverty line, including 27.60% of those under age 18 and 12.50% of those age 65 or over.

Politics
Like many Colorado counties with a strong Hispanic presence, Saguache leans Democratic in Presidential elections. The last Republican to carry the county was Ronald Reagan in 1984.

Communities

Towns
Bonanza
Center
Crestone
Moffat
Saguache

Unincorporated Communities

Alder
Bonita
Chester
Duncan
Iris
Kerper
La Garita
Liberty
Mineral Hot Springs
Parkville
Sargents
Spook City
Villa Grove

National Register of Historic Places

Saguache County has nine locations listed in the National Register of Historic Places.

See also

Outline of Colorado
Index of Colorado-related articles
Colorado counties
Colorado municipalities
State of Colorado

References

Further reading
Lindsey, D.A. et al. (1985). Mineral resources of the Black Canyon and South Piney Creek Wilderness Study Areas, Saguache County, Colorado [U.S. Geological Survey Bulletin 1716-A]. Washington, D.C.: U.S Department of the Interior, U.S. Geological Survey.

External links

Crestone and Saguache County Visitor's Agency website
Colorado County Evolution by Don Stanwyck
Colorado Historical Society

 

 
Colorado counties
Colorado placenames of Native American origin
1866 establishments in Colorado Territory
San Luis Valley of Colorado
Populated places established in 1866